Bennie Lewis III (born June 29, 1987) is an American-Australian professional basketball player for the Waverley Falcons of the NBL1 South. He played college basketball for Benedict College before beginning a successful four-year stint with the Melbourne Tigers in 2009. He later played in the NBA Development League and the British Basketball League.

Early life and high school
Lewis was born in Melbourne, Australia while his father, Bennie Lewis Jr., was playing in the National Basketball League for the North Melbourne Giants. He is the grandson of the legendary Illinois Hall of Fame basketball coach Bennie Lewis Sr., who coached the likes of LaPhonso Ellis, Cuonzo Martin and Darius Miles. Although born in Australia, Lewis was raised in Fort Wayne, Indiana and moved to East St. Louis, Illinois the beginning of his junior year in high school.

As a junior at East St. Louis in 2003–04, Lewis led the team in free throw percentage (81.3) while only committing 10 turnovers and 14 fouls in 27 games for the Flyers, averaging 3.7 points and 1.2 rebounds per game.

As a senior in 2004–05, Lewis averaged 10.5 points, 4.5 rebounds, 2.7 assists and 1.4 steals in 27 games for the Flyers. He had a season-best game against Cahokia, recording 23 points and 8 rebounds. For his performance at the Thanksgiving Holiday Tournament, he earned All-Tournament Team honors.

College career
As a freshman at Benedict College in 2005–06, Lewis helped the Tigers go 22–7 on the season and helped them win the conference championship. They earned a spot in the NCAA Division II Tournament where they were knocked out in the first round. In 29 games (7 starts), he averaged 5.2 points and 2.0 rebounds in 12.5 minutes per game.

As a sophomore in 2006–07, Lewis helped the Tigers go 25–5 on the season and helped them win the conference championship for a second straight year. They earned a spot in the NCAA Division II Tournament where they were again knocked out in the first round. In 30 games (3 starts), he averaged 6.6 points and 2.3 rebounds in 14.5 minutes per game.

As a junior in 2007–08, Lewis earned second-team All-SIAC, Paine Classic Tournament MVP, and NCAA D2 South Region All-Tournament Team honors. He helped the Tigers go 28–5 on the season and helped them win the conference championship for a third straight year. The Tigers went on to win the SIAC Tournament and booked themselves a spot in the NCAA Division II Tournament, making their way through to the third round. In 32 games (14 starts), he averaged 11.3 points, 3.8 rebounds and 1.5 assists in 29.6 minutes per game.

As a senior in 2008–09, Lewis helped the Tigers go 24–6 on the season and helped them earn conference runners-up honors. They also earned a spot in the NCAA Division II Tournament where they were knocked out in the first round for the third time in four years. In 30 games (16 starts), he averaged 11.3 points, 4.1 rebounds and 1.7 assists in 32.0 minutes per game.

Lewis finished his career having played in 121 games with 1,051 career points. He also recorded 173 career three-pointer, 369 career rebounds, and 128 career assists. As a junior and senior, he earned All-SIAC Academic Team honors, while also earning NABC Academic Honor Roll honors as a senior.

Professional career

Decatur Court Kings
After graduating from Benedict College, Lewis joined the Decatur Court Kings of the World Basketball Association (WBA). Over his three-month stint with the Kings, he led the team to the semi-finals and averaged over 20 points per game. He subsequently earned All-WBA First Team honors and was named the 2009 WBA Rookie of the Year.

Melbourne Tigers
In September 2009, Lewis signed with the Melbourne Tigers as a development player for the 2009–10 NBL season. During the season, he shared court time with fellow rookie Ryan Bathie. He appeared in 13 games for the Tigers in 2009–10, averaging 1.4 points per game. Following the conclusion of the NBL season, Lewis joined the Tigers' junior affiliate team in the Big V. In 20 games for the junior squad during the 2010 Big V season, he averaged 20.9 points, 7.0 rebounds, 1.9 assists, 1.2 steals and 1.1 blocks per game.

On April 8, 2010, Lewis signed with the Melbourne Tigers on a full-time contract. He appeared in all 28 games for the Tigers in 2010–11, averaging a serviceable 4.3 points and 1.2 rebounds per game. He again played for the Tigers' junior squad during the 2011 Big V season, averaging 17.2 points, 7.0 rebounds, 1.7 assists, 1.3 steals and 1.3 blocks in 18 games.

Lewis returned to the Melbourne Tigers for the 2011–12 NBL season, and averaged 3.1 points in 26 games. For the 2012 Big V season, he joined the Waverley Falcons and attempted to guide the team to a third-straight championship. He was unsuccessful in doing so, but still had a solid season for the Falcons as he averaged 16.0 points, 6.5 rebounds, 2.1 assists, 1.2 steals and 2.1 blocks in 20 games.

Lewis continued on with the Tigers during the 2012–13 NBL season, and on December 22, he won the 2012 All-Star Slam Dunk Competition. In 27 games for the Tigers in 2012–13, he averaged 3.7 points and 1.0 rebounds per game.

Perth Redbacks
On April 4, 2013, Lewis signed with the Perth Redbacks for the rest of the 2013 State Basketball League season. In 25 games for the Redbacks, he averaged 22.9 points, 6.4 rebounds, 4.1 assists and 1.2 steals per game.

Fort Wayne Mad Ants and Geraldton Buccaneers
On December 5, 2013, Lewis was acquired by the Fort Wayne Mad Ants of the NBA Development League. He made his debut for the Mad Ants two days later, scoring nine points in 21 minutes off the bench against the Sioux Falls Skyforce. On December 15, he scored a season-high 19 points in the Mad Ants' 108–100 win over the Delaware 87ers. On February 17, 2014, he was waived by the Mad Ants. In 11 games for Fort Wayne in 2013–14, he averaged 7.4 points, 1.5 rebounds and 1.4 assists per game.

Following his release from the Mad Ants, Lewis returned to Western Australia and joined the Geraldton Buccaneers for the 2014 State Basketball League season. He made his debut for the Buccaneers in the team's season opener, and went on to lead his team to the minor premiership with a 19–7 record. The Buccaneers reached the SBL Grand Final, where they lost to the East Perth Eagles. Lewis appeared in all 31 games for the Buccaneers in 2014, averaging 26.0 points, 4.7 rebounds and 2.9 assists per game.

In October 2014, Lewis participated in Mad Ants' try-outs and earned himself a spot on the 2014–15 season roster. However, his second stint with the team lasted just three games, as he was waived by the Mad Ants on November 28. Lewis subsequently returned to Geraldton and re-joined the Buccaneers for the 2015 season. He was selected to play in the 2015 SBL All-Star Game for the North Stars, scoring a team-high 19 points in a 143–135 loss to the South Stars. The Buccs finished in second place in 2015 with a 20–6 record, but were knocked out in the quarter-finals by the Goldfields Giants. Lewis earned SBL All-Star Five honors, and in 28 games on the season, he averaged 29.3 points, 5.7 rebounds and 4.0 assists per game.

Plymouth Raiders
On May 8, 2015, Lewis signed with the Plymouth Raiders for the 2015–16 British Basketball League season. He played in the Raiders' first two games of the season before travelling to Fort Wayne in mid-October to try out for the Mad Ants again. Upon completing the try-outs, he returned to Plymouth after missing two straight games. He appeared in Plymouth's October 30 match-up against the Leicester Riders before departing the team for good and joining the Mad Ants on November 2 for the start of training camp. However, he was waived by the Mad Ants on November 11 prior to the start of the regular season.

Frankston Blues
On December 10, 2015, Lewis signed with the Frankston Blues for the 2016 SEABL season. He made his debut for the Blues in the team's season opener on April 3, scoring 15 points in 38 minutes of action as a starter in an 81–76 win over the Albury Wodonga Bandits. In the team's second game of the season on April 9, he recorded team highs of 24 points and 9 rebounds in an 84–72 loss to the Kilsyth Cobras. On April 29, Lewis scored a game-high 20 points in an 85–55 loss to the Hobart Chargers. On June 18, he scored a season-high 29 points in a 92–88 win over the Bandits. On June 26, he set a new season high with 31 points in an 81–75 loss to the Chargers. He surpassed that mark on July 10, scoring 35 points on 15-of-26 shooting from the field (with only one made three-pointer) in a 108–97 loss to the Ballarat Miners. The Blues finished last out of eight teams in the SEABL South Conference (third last overall) with a 6–18 record. Lewis appeared in all 24 games for the Blues, averaging 19.9 points, 4.7 rebounds and 2.9 assists per game.

Melbourne United
On October 7, 2016, Lewis joined Melbourne United as a short-term injury replacement for David Barlow. He made his debut for United on November 4, missing his only three-point attempt in just under three minutes off the bench in a 98–92 loss to the New Zealand Breakers. Two days later, he recorded three points, one rebound, one assist and one steal in just under seven minutes off the bench in an 82–73 loss to the Illawarra Hawks. With Barlow's return to the squad in mid-November, Lewis was removed from United's active roster. On January 12, 2017, he was elevated to the active roster following a number of injuries to key players. That night, he scored three points in five minutes against the Adelaide 36ers.

Return to Frankston
On February 6, 2017, Lewis re-signed with the Frankston Blues on a two-year deal. In Frankston's season opener on March 25, 2017, Lewis scored 16 points in a 77–67 loss to the Kilsyth Cobras. On April 29, he scored a season-high 25 points in an 87–84 win over the NW Tasmania Thunder. On July 14, he set a new season high with 28 points in a 102–95 overtime win over the Bendigo Braves. The Blues finished last out of seven teams in the SEABL South Conference with a 7–17 record. Lewis appeared in all 24 games for the Blues, averaging 15.6 points, 4.4 rebounds and 3.4 assists per game.

In Frankston's 2018 season opener on April 7, Lewis played all 40 minutes and scored a game-high 29 points in an 82–72 loss to the Albury Wodonga Bandits. On June 30, he recorded 21 points and 14 rebounds off the bench in a 101–75 win over the Bandits. The Blues finished the season second from the bottom with a 4–16 record. In 18 games, Lewis averaged 18.9 points, 7.1 rebounds and 2.9 assists per game.

Return to Waverley
On December 20, 2018, Lewis signed with the Waverley Falcons of the newly-established NBL1 competition for the 2019 season, returning to the team for a second stint. In 20 games, he averaged 15.2 points, 5.0 rebounds, 3.5 assists and 1.6 steals per game.

On October 29, 2019, Lewis re-signed with the Falcons on a two-year deal. However, he did not play in 2020 after the NBL1 season was cancelled due to the COVID-19 pandemic. He renewed his two-year contract with the Falcons in March 2021 ahead of the NBL1 South season.

Personal
Lewis' father, Bennie Jr., played 10 seasons in the NBL between 1981 and 1990.

References

External links

High school and college bio
NBA D-League profile
BBL stats

1987 births
Living people
American expatriate basketball people in Australia
American expatriate basketball people in the United Kingdom
American men's basketball players
Basketball players from Fort Wayne, Indiana
Benedict Tigers men's basketball players
Fort Wayne Mad Ants players
Melbourne Tigers players
Melbourne United players
Shooting guards
Small forwards
Basketball players from Melbourne